This is a list of lists of towns and villages by country:

Abkhazia
 Sukhumi 62,910

Andorra
 Andorra la Vella 22,890

Antigua and Barbuda
 St. John's, Antigua and Barbuda 22,190

Argentina

Artsakh
 Stepanakert 55,200

Aruba
 Oranjestad, Aruba 34,980

Australia

 Aberdare, New South Wales 2,475

Austria

Bahrain
List of cities in Bahrain

Barbados
 Bridgetown 110,000
 Hastings, Barbados 1,500

Belize
 Belize City 57,170
 Belmopan 20,620

Bhutan
 Thimphu 114,550
 Paro, Bhutan 11,450

British Virgin Islands
 Road Town 12,600

Brunei
 Bandar Seri Begawan 100,700

Bulgaria

 Sliven 91,620
 Dobrich

Canada

Cayman Islands
 George Town, Cayman Islands 28,840

Chile

Comoros
 Moroni, Comoros 54,000

Croatia

Curacao
 Willemstad 150,000

Cyprus
List of cities, towns and villages in Cyprus
 South Nicosia 55,000

Denmark

Dominica
 Roseau 14,720

East Timor
List of cities, towns and villages in East Timor

Equatorial Guinea
List of cities in Equatorial Guinea

Estonia

Eswatini
 Mbabane 94,870

Faroe Islands

 Tórshavn 13,100

Fiji
 Suva 88,270

Finland

France

French Polynesia
 Papeete 26,930

Gambia

 Banjul 31,300

Germany

Greece

Greenland
 Nuuk 17,980

Grenada
 St. George's, Grenada 33,730

Guam
 Dededo 44,940

Guernsey
 Saint Peter Port 18,200

Guinea-Bissau
List of cities in Guinea-Bissau

Hong Kong

Hungary

Iceland

 Reykjavík 128,790

Republic of Ireland

India

Isle of Man
 Douglas, Isle of Man 27,940

Israel

Jersey
 Saint Helier 33,500

Kiribati
 South Tarawa 50,180

Kosovo
List of cities in Kosovo

Latvia
List of cities and towns in Latvia

Lesotho
List of cities in Lesotho

Luxembourg
List of towns in Luxembourg

Maldives
 Male 133,410

Malta

Marshall Islands
 Majuro 27,800

New Caledonia
 Noumea 99,930

New Zealand

Northern Cyprus
 North Nicosia 61,380

North Macedonia
List of cities in North Macedonia

Norway
Norway officially does not designate between towns and cities. The general Norwegian term for both is "by".

Palau
 Koror City 11,200

Papua New Guinea

Poland

Portugal

Republic of Artsakh
 Stepanakert 55,200

Romania

Russia

Saint Kitts and Nevis
 Basseterre 14,000

Saint Lucia
 Castries 20,000

Saint Vincent and the Grenadines
 Kingstown 16,500

Samoa
 Apia 36,730

Sao Tome and Principe
 Sao Tome 71,870

Saudi Arabia

Seychelles
 Victoria, Seychelles 26,450

Slovakia

Slovenia

Solomon Islands
 Honiara 84,520

South Africa

South Ossetia
 Tskhinvali 30,000

Spain

Sweden

Syria

Tonga
 Nuku'alofa 24,570

Transnistria
 Tiraspol 133,810

Trinidad and Tobago
 Chaguanas 83,490
 Port of Spain 37,000

United Kingdom

 Lists of towns and cities in England by population

United States

United States Virgin Islands
 Charlotte Amalie, U.S. Virgin Islands 18,480

Uruguay

Vanuatu
 Port Vila 44,000

See also
List of cities and towns
List of cities
List of towns of the world